Gérard Cholley (born June 6, 1945 in Fontaine-les-Luxeuil, France) is a retired French international rugby union player.

He played as a Prop for Castres Olympique.
He earned his first cap with the French national team on 1 February 1975 against England at Twickenham.

Honours 
 Selected to represent France, 1975–1979
 Grand Slam : 1977

External links
 Gérard Cholley International Statistics
  The top 10 frightening Frenchmen

French rugby union players
Living people
France international rugby union players
1945 births
Rugby union props